The Kent County Football Association, known as Kent FA, is the governing body of football in the county of Kent, England, and was formed in 1881. The Kent FA run over 20 County Cups at different levels of football for affiliated teams across Kent.

History
The Kent County FA was formed in October 1881 by two friends – M.P, Betts (Secretary) and G.W. Prall (Treasurer).

Over the next few years, matters became more formalised. Mr A.G.O Kennedy was appointed secretary in 1888, and he made a great difference in creating a proper structure for football. He was taken ill in 1892 and died in December of that year.

From Mr. Kennedy’s base P.J. Leckie became secretary and served until 1986 and was succeeded by J Albert, who served until 1905. During that time the association made great strides forward, reaching a total of 297 clubs and 41 leagues. In 1905 the gate receipts from the Kent Senior Cup Final amounted to £233.

In 1905 J. Albert relinquished his position as secretary through pressure of outside commitments. The council later that year resolved that position of secretary become a full-time post at maximum salary of £80 per annum for 3 years. It was also resolved that the secretary must reside in Chatham. Frank Lockwood was appointed as the first full-time secretary and served until his death in 1914. By that time the number of affiliated clubs had risen to 600.

After the First World War had ended, Captain J. Rigden assumed the role of secretary and served until 1926, when he was replaced by much revered Stanley Brown.

Stanley became the longest-serving secretary occupying the position until 1964. It was Stanley’s foresight which enabled the association to acquire 69 Maidstone Road, Chatham, which remained the headquarters for 62 years until 2009, when the association relocated to Cobdown, Ditton.

Brown retired in 1964 and was replaced by Dick Speake. He in turn reached retirement age in 1978, when Keith Masters had the "honour and privilege" of taking over the role of secretary, which became Chief Executive on incorporation in November 2000. Keith Masters retired in 2010 and was succeeded as Chief Executive Officer by Paul Dolan in January 2011.

The Association has grown into a moderate business employing almost 20 members of staff providing football for leagues, clubs, players, referees and anyone that wants to be involved or just loves the game.

Organisation
Kent FA aims to establish safe and structured football opportunities for the benefit of all concerned irrespective of age, colour, gender and disability. They aim to provide the appropriate structures and systems to enable the association to control, manage, regulate and promote the game within the County.

Kent FA was formed in 1881 and has governed the game of football, under the aegis of The Football Association since that date. Kent FA became a Company Limited by Guarantee on November 1, 2000. Kent is the fifth largest county affiliated to The Football Association and is divided into four geographical divisions for administration purposes.

There are 66 council members, and 48 of these are elected to serve within the area that they live.

Affiliated leagues

Men's Saturday leagues
 Kent County Football League**
 Ashford and District League
 Bromley and South London Football League 
 Canterbury and District League
 Rochester and District League
 Sevenoaks and District League
 Thanet and District Veterans League

''Footnote: ** Regional NLS Feeder League.

Men's Sunday leagues
Ashford and District Sunday League
Dover Sunday League
Herne Bay and Whitstable Sunday League
Maidstone and Mid Kent Sunday League
Medway Messenger Sunday League
North Kent Sunday League
Orpington and Bromley District Sunday League
Sheppey Sunday League
Thanet Sunday League
West Kent Sunday League

Other leagues
Kent Disability League

Youth leagues
Ashford and District Youth League
East Kent Youth League
Faversham and District youth League
Kent Youth League
Maidstone Boys Primary League
Maidstone Invicta Primary League
Maidstone Minor League
Medway Youth League
North Kent Youth League

Ladies and girls leagues
Kent Girls/Ladies League
South East Counties Womens League

Small sided leagues
Ashford 5-A-Side Super League (1983)
Ashford Supersixes
Faversham and District Indoor 5-a-Side League
Kent Cricket Academy 5-a-Side League (2004)
Kicks Soccer Centre
Medway Park 5-a-Side League
Medway Towns Red Triangle 5-a-Side League
Pitch Invasion
Sittingbourne Indoors 5-a-Side League

Disbanded or amalgamated leagues
Leagues that were affiliated to the Kent County FA but have disbanded or amalgamated with other leagues include:

Beckenham League
Bromley and District Football League
Dartford and District League
Deal and District Sunday League
Dover League
East Kent League
Folkestone Junior League
Gravesend League
Hythe, Folkestone and District Sunday League
Maidstone and District League
New Brompton League
North East Kent League
South London Football Alliance
Southern Suburban League
Thames and Medway Combination
Thanet Works League
Tonbridge and District League
Tunbridge Wells League
Weald of Kent League
West Kent League

Affiliated member clubs
Among the notable clubs that are (or at one time were) affiliated to the Kent County FA are:

Alma Swanley (now defunct)
Ashford United (1880) (now defunct)
Ashford United
Beckenham Town
Brett Sports (now defunct)
Canterbury City
Charlton Athletic
Chatham Town
Cray Valley Paper Mills
Cray Wanderers
Crockenhill
Corinthian

Deal Town
Dover (now defunct)
Dover Athletic
Ebbsfleet United
Erith & Belvedere
Erith Town
Faversham Town
Fisher
Folkestone Invicta
Folkestone Town (now defunct)
Gillingham
Gravesend United 
Gravesend & Northfleet (now Ebbsfleet United)

Greenwich Borough
Herne Bay
Holmesdale
Hythe Town
Lordswood
Maidstone United
Margate
Millwall
Northfleet United 
Norton Sports
Orpington

Ramsgate
Sevenoaks Town
Sheppey United
Sittingbourne
Slade Green
Swanley Furness
Sutton Athletic
Thamesmead Town
Tonbridge Angels
Tunbridge Wells
VCD Athletic
Whitstable Town

In 1946 Gravesend United merged with Northfleet United to form Gravesend & Northfleet who are now known as Ebbsfleet United.

County Cup competitions
The Kent County FA run 20 County Cup competitions:

Kent Senior Cup
Kent Senior Trophy
Kent Intermediate Cup
Kent Intermediate Challenge Shield
Kent Junior Cups – Junior Cup A, Junior Cup B & Junior Cup C
Kent Sunday Cups – Sunday Premier Cup, Sunday Junior Cup, Sunday Junior Trophy
Kent Veteran's Cup

Youth Cup Under 18 – Boys
Youth Cup Under 16 – Boys
Youth Cup Under 15 – Boys
Youth Cup Under 14 – Boys
Youth Cup Under 13 – Boys

Women's Cup
Women's Plate
Girls Cup Under 16
Girls Cup Under 14

Source

Charity Cup Competitions

Ashford Charity Trophy
Beckenham Hospital Invitation Charity Cup Comp.
Gordon Charity Cup
Gravesend Hospital Challenge Cup Competition

Hawkhurst Charity Cup
North Kent Sunday & KSFL Charity Shield (1962)
Sittingbourne & Milton Charity Cup

The Hospitals Charity Cup
Tunbridge Wells & District Charity Cups Competition
Weald Of Kent Charity Cup

Source

Senior Cup

The Kent Senior Cup is a county cup competition involving senior teams affiliated to the Kent County Football Association.

List of recent Kent County Cup winners

Source

List of recent Kent County Junior Cup winners

Source

Directors and officials

Directors
D. Richmond (Chair)
M. Tapp 
L. Dyson
K. Discipline
A. Van Orsouw
B. Stoneham

Staff
Darryl Haden  (Chief Executive)
Richard Judd (Football Services Manager)
Jeff Davis (Football Development Manager)

References

External links

County football associations
 
1881 establishments in England
Sports organizations established in 1881